Ahmad Obeidat (born 18 November 1938) is a former Jordanian politician who served as the 26th Prime Minister of Jordan from 10 January 1984 to 4 April 1985. He was born in Hartha, Irbid 18 November 1938.

- Teacher, Ministry of Education, 1957.

- Officer, Ministry of Finance, Customs Department, 1962.

- Officer, Public Security Department, 1962–1964.

- Officer, General Intelligence Department, 1964–1974.

- Director of General Intelligence Department, 1974–1982.

- Minister of Interior 1982–1984.

- Prime Minister January 1984 – April 1985.

He was a Member of the Senate for several periods of his active time since 1984; a member of the Jordan Bar Association since 9 July 1985; UNDP goodwill ambassador, 1990; founder and member of Jordan Environment Society, 1986–2003 and chairman of the board of trustees currently. Founding member and chairman of the Jordan National Society for Consumer Protection, 1989; chairman of the Royal Committee for Drafting the National Charter, 1990–1991; deputy chairman of the Royal Human Rights Commission, appointed on 23 March 2000; deputy chairman of the Royal Commission for Judicial Reform, appointed on 31 August 2000; chairman of the board of trustees of the National Center for Human Rights, 19 February 2003 – 1 July 2008; member of the board of trustees of the Arab Anti-Corruption Organization; attorney and legal consultant practicing in his private firm as of 1985.

In May 2011, he launched the National Front for Reform.

See also 
 List of prime ministers of Jordan

References

External links
 Prime Ministry of Jordan website

1938 births
Defence ministers of Jordan
Government ministers of Jordan
Interior ministers of Jordan
Jordanian military personnel
Living people
People from Irbid
Members of the Senate of Jordan
Prime Ministers of Jordan
University of Baghdad alumni